The First Leg of the 2018–19 Curling World Cup took place from September 12 to 16, 2018 at the Suzhou Olympic Sports Center in Suzhou, China.

Canada had a clean sweep, winning all three disciplines. Rachel Homan's team beat out the Swedish Anna Hasselborg rink in the women's final, team Kevin Koe defeated Norway's Steffen Walstad in the men's event, and Laura Walker and Kirk Muyres beat out Sarah Anderson and Korey Dropkin from the United States for mixed doubles gold.

Format

Curling World Cup matches have eight ends, rather than the standard ten ends. Ties after eight ends will be decided by a shoot-out, with each team throwing a stone and the one closest to the button winning. A win in eight or fewer ends will earn a team 3 points, a shoot-out win 2 points, a shoot-out less 1 point, and 0 points for a loss in eight or fewer ends.

Each event will have eight teams in the men's, women's, and mixed doubles tournament. The teams will be split into two groups of four, based on the Curling World Cup rankings, whereby the 1st, 3rd, 5th, and 7th, ranked teams will be in one group and the 2nd, 4th, 6th, and 8th ranked teams in the other. The first place teams in each group will play against each other in the final. In the event of a tie for first place, a shoot-out will be used, with the same format used to decide matches tied after eight ends.

Qualification

For the first three legs of the Curling World Cup, the eight spots in the tournament are allocated to each of the hosting member associations, the highest ranked member association in each zone (the Americas, European, and Pacific-Asia), and two teams chosen by the World Curling Federation. Member associations may choose to send the same teams to all three legs or have different teams.

The following countries qualified for each discipline:

Women

Teams

Round-robin standings

After Draw 15

Round-robin results

Draw 1

Wednesday, September 12, 15:00

Draw 4

Thursday, September 13, 08:30

Draw 5

Thursday, September 13, 12:00

Draw 6

Thursday, September 13, 16:00

Draw 7

Thursday, September 13, 19:30

Draw 8

Friday, September 15, 08:30

Draw 9

Friday, September 15, 12:00

Draw 10

Friday, September 15, 16:00

Draw 11

Friday, September 15, 19:30

Draw 12

Saturday, September 16, 08:30

Draw 13

Saturday, September 16, 12:00

Draw 15

Saturday, September 16, 19:30

Final

Sunday, September 17, 12:00

Men

Teams

Round-robin standings

After Draw 15

Round-robin results

Draw 3

Wednesday, September 12, 21:00

Draw 5

Thursday, September 13, 12:00

Draw 7

Thursday, September 13, 19:30

Draw 9

Friday, September 14, 12:00

Draw 10

Friday, September 14, 16:00

Draw 12

Saturday, September 15, 08:30

Draw 14

Saturday, September 15, 16:00

Draw 15

Saturday, September 15, 19:30

Final

Sunday, September 17, 16:00

Mixed doubles

Teams

Round-robin standings

After Draw 14

Round-robin results

Draw 2

Wednesday, September 12, 18:30

Draw 4

Thursday, September 13, 08:30

Draw 6

Thursday, September 13, 16:00

Draw 8

Friday, September 14, 08:30

Draw 9

Friday, September 14, 12:00

Draw 10

Friday, September 14, 16:00

Draw 11

Friday, September 14, 19:30

Draw 13

Saturday, September 15, 12:00

Draw 14

Saturday, September 15, 16:00

Final

Sunday, September 16, 08:30

References

External links

 

Curling World Cup
Curling World Cup – First Leg
Sport in Suzhou
International curling competitions hosted by China
Curling World Cup – First Leg
Curling World Cup – First Leg